Richard Dorsett (3 December 1919 – November 1999) was an English footballer, who played as a striker. Dorsett was sometimes known as "the Brownhills Bomber" after his birthplace of Brownhills, Staffordshire (now West Midlands).

Football career 
Dorsett started his career with Wolverhampton Wanderers, making his debut in 1938. During that season he scored their only goal in the 4–1 defeat by Portsmouth in the 1939 FA Cup Final.

During World War II, Dorsett served with the RAF and guested for Brentford, Grimsby Town, Liverpool, Queens Park Rangers and Southampton, for whom he made 16 appearances, scoring 23 goals. He was a member of the Wolves side that won the 1942 Football League War Cup and played 58 wartime games, scoring 40 goals.

In September 1946, he joined Aston Villa for £3,000. His career almost came to an end in 1950 when he was involved in a car crash, but he recovered and played another three seasons before retiring from the game in 1953.

Later career 
He stayed at Aston Villa coaching the club's youth team before joining Liverpool in 1957 as assistant trainer, a job he held until 1962.

He died in November 1999, a month before what would have been his 80th birthday.

Honours
Wolverhampton Wanderers
FA Cup finalist: 1939

References

External links
Article on "Wolves Old Gold"

1919 births
1999 deaths
People from Brownhills
English footballers
English Football League players
Wolverhampton Wanderers F.C. players
Aston Villa F.C. players
Southampton F.C. wartime guest players
Liverpool F.C. wartime guest players
Brentford F.C. wartime guest players
Grimsby Town F.C. wartime guest players
Queens Park Rangers F.C. wartime guest players
Association football forwards
Royal Air Force personnel of World War II
FA Cup Final players
Royal Air Force airmen
Military personnel from Staffordshire